Group B of the 2008 Rugby League World Cup was one of the three groups of teams that competed in the 2008 Rugby League World Cup. Group B consisted of three teams: Fiji, Scotland and France. After all teams played had each other once, only Fiji advanced to 2008 Rugby League World Cup knockout stage.

Standings
In the knockout stage, Fiji played in the qualifying final while Scotland and France played for 7th and 9th place respectively.

Matches

France vs Scotland

Fiji vs France

Scotland vs Fiji

References

Group B